Experience & Education is an album by rapper Sadat X, of the group Brand Nubian. The album features production from Diamond D, DJ Spinna, Kleph Dollaz and Ge-ology, and guest appearances from Heltah Skeltah, Edo G, Agallah and the Money Boss Players. The album's lead single was "What Did I Do?" b/w "The Great Diamond D."

Track listing

References

2005 albums
Sadat X albums
Albums produced by DJ Spinna
Albums produced by Diamond D